The Yellow Ribbon Suicide Prevention Program (YRSPP) is a suicide prevention program based in the United States, and aimed in particular at teenagers. The program is run by the Yellow Ribbon non-profit.  YRSPP uses a yellow ribbon with a heart to encourage awareness about suicide / suicide prevention.

Yellow Ribbon Week 
YRSPP observe a suicide prevention week called Yellow Ribbon Week annually in September. Yellow Ribbon Week is the week including World Suicide Prevention Day, September 9.

History 
The Yellow Ribbon Suicide Prevention Program began in 1994, after the death of Mike Emme by suicide.

References

External links 
 Yellow Ribbon Suicide Prevention Program

Suicide prevention